Maurice Portman may refer to:

 Maurice Berkeley Portman (1833–1888), political figure in Canada West
 Maurice Vidal Portman (1860–1935), British naval officer